Vivekananda Degree College (also known as "Vivekananda College of Arts, Science & Commerce" or "VC Puttur") is located in the locality of Nehru Nagar, about 3 km north-east to the center of the city of Puttur in Karnataka state, India.  This college is run by Vivekananda Vidyavardhaka Sangha Puttur (VVS).

The college is accredited at 'A' by National Assessment and Accreditation Council. The college totally has around 2000 students and 100 faculty members in various disciplines.

History 

Established in 1965 by a private organization "Puttur Education Society". The college is named after influential spiritual leaders and philosopher Swami Vivekananda.

The visionaries and members of 'Puttur Education Society' (now renamed as 'Vivekananda Vidyavardhaka Sangha') behind the origin of this college are Molahalli Shiva Rao, Baindoor Rama Rao, Dharmastala Manjayya Heggade, Rao Bahadur Raghunatha Rao, Baindoor Prabhakar Rao, Jnanapeeta award winner Dr Kota Shivarama Karanth, and Sri K Rama Bhat..

Academics
The duration of the courses for bachelor's degree is three years. All courses include two mandatory languages: English and either Kannada, Hindi or Sanskrit. Courses award Bachelor of Arts (B.A), Bachelor of Science (B.Sc), Bachelor of Commerce (B.Com), Bachelor of Business Management (B.B.M.) or Bachelor of Computer Application (B.C.A.). In addition there are one year certificate course and two year diploma course in Rural Marketing.

Admissions 
The admissions, based on the availability of seats, are open to everyone who has completed Pre University Course (or any other 11th and 12th grade course that is considered equivalent by the Mangalore University). Those seeking admission to B.Sc. should have studied Science in PUC. Those seeking admission to B.Com. and B.B.M. should have studied Business Studies and Accountancy in PUC. Those seeking admission to B.A and B.C.A. could come from any stream.

Campus 
Vivekananda College campus is spread over an area of about  located in Nehru Nagar, approximately 3 km from the city of Puttur, Karnataka. A statue of Swami Vivekananda is situated at the entrance of the campus.

Library
The College library is located very close to the main College building. The library follows an open-access system and allows outsiders too to use books of referral worth and this library is considered one of the best libraries under the affiliated Colleges of Mangalore university with more than 77,000 volumes.

Hostels
The hostels for boys and girls are available at a very subsidized rate for students from remote places and are situated within the campus. They also have individual attached vegetarian messes to cater to meals for hostelers.

Vivekananda College Employees Co-operative Society
The campus also houses a Co-operative Society which supplies all the necessary day-to-day items to the inmates at a reasonable price. And the banking section in the Co-operative Society helps the staff and students in the campus to handle their savings bank  accounts.

See also 
 Mangalore University

References

External links 
 vc.vivekanandaedu.org, Official Website
 Vivekananda Vidyavardhaka Sangha Website

Colleges in Karnataka
Universities and colleges in Dakshina Kannada district
Educational institutions established in 1965
1965 establishments in Mysore State
Colleges of Mangalore University